James Audley or James de Audley may refer to:

 James Audley (1318–1369), Knight of the Garter
 James Audley, 2nd Baron Audley (1312/1313–1386), English peer
 James Audley (died 1272) (1220–1272), English baron